The Seguros Bolívar Open Medellín was a new addition to the ITF Women's Circuit.

Irina-Camelia Begu and María Irigoyen won the inaugural tournament, defeating Monique Adamczak and Marina Shamayko in the final, 6–2, 7–6(7–2).

Seeds

Draw

References 
 Draw

Seguros Bolivar Open Medellin - Doubles
Seguros Bolívar Open Medellín